Collin Randall Wilcox (February 4, 1935 – October 14, 2009) was an American film, stage and television actress. Over her career, she was also credited as Collin Wilcox-Horne or Collin Wilcox-Paxton.  Wilcox may be best known for her role in To Kill a Mockingbird (1962), in which she played Mayella Violet Ewell, whose father falsely claimed she had been raped by a black man, which sparks the trial at the center of the film.

Early years
Wilcox was born in Cincinnati, Ohio, and moved with her family to Highlands, North Carolina, as a baby. Her interest in theater was sparked by her parents, Jack H. and Virginia Wilcox, who founded the Highlands Community Theater (now known as the Highlands Playhouse) in 1939.

She attended the University of Tennessee, where she studied drama.

Career

Wilcox made her professional debut in Chicago as part of the improvisational group, The Compass Players, which included Mike Nichols, Elaine May, and Shelley Berman.

Playing opposite Richard Basehart, Kevin McCarthy, and William Hansen, Wilcox won the Clarence Derwent Award for her performance in The Day The Money Stopped by Maxwell Anderson and Brendan Gill, which lasted only three nights on Broadway in 1958. She starred in the 1961 play Look, We've Come Through with Burt Reynolds on Broadway. She replaced another actress in the 1963 revival of Eugene O'Neill's Strange Interlude and then went on to do the 1965 play The Family Way, both on Broadway.

A life member of The Actors Studio, Wilcox is perhaps best known for her role in the 1962 film To Kill a Mockingbird, in which she played Mayella Violet Ewell, who falsely accuses Tom Robinson (Brock Peters) of raping her. Following that cinematic acting success, she performed two very memorable roles for television in 1964: The Twilight Zone episode "Number 12 Looks Just Like You" and The Alfred Hitchcock Hour episode "The Jar", based on the Ray Bradbury short story.

She appeared as Bess Frye in a 1972 episode of Gunsmoke titled "Jubilee". In 1974, she co-starred with Peter Falk and Robert Conrad in the Columbo episode "An Exercise in Fatality" as Ruth Stafford. She remained active performing both on television and in films. Her final role was that of Mrs. Kline in the movie A Touch of Fate, which was released in 2003, six years before her death.

Civil rights activism
She recalled receiving "unfriendly looks" when she showed up at an NAACP conference in Monterey, California, because in the film To Kill a Mockingbird, she played a white woman who falsely accused Tom Robinson, a black man, of raping her. An official had to remind participants: "Collin is here at this conference because she believes in the cause. She is not the character in the film."

Death
On October 14, 2009, Wilcox died from brain cancer, aged 74, at her home in Highlands, North Carolina. She was cremated and her ashes returned to her family.

Filmography

 Twice Upon a Time (1953) - Ian
 To Kill a Mockingbird (1962) - Mayella Violet Ewell
The Name of the Game Is Kill! (1968) - Diz Terry
 The Sound of Anger (1968, TV Movie) - Ann Kochek
 Catch-22 (1970) - Nurse Cramer
 The Revolutionary (1970) - Ann
 The Baby Maker (1970) - Suzanne
 Jump (1971) - April Mae
 The Man Who Could Talk to Kids (1973, TV Movie) - Honor Lassiter
 The Autobiography of Miss Jane Pittman (1974, TV Movie) - Mistress Bryant
 A Cry in the Wilderness (1974, TV Movie) - Bess Millard
 The Lives of Jenny Dolan (1975, TV Movie) - Mrs. Owens
 September 30, 1955 (1977) - Jimmy J.'s Mother
 Jaws 2 (1978) - Dr. Elkins
 Under This Sky (1979, TV Movie) - Susan B. Anthony
 Marie (1985) - Virginia
 Foxfire (1987, TV Movie) - Madge Burton
 Wildflower (1991, TV Movie) - Bessie Morgan
 The Portrait (1993, TV Movie) - Chancellor
 Fluke (1995) - Bella
 The Journey of August King (1996) - Mina
 Twisted Desire (1996, TV Movie) - Rose Stanton 
 Midnight in the Garden of Good and Evil (1997) - Woman at Party
 A Touch of Fate (2003) - Mrs. Kline (final film role)

Selected television appearances
 The Untouchables: Season 3, Episode 77 - "Takeover" (March 3, 1962)
 Route 66: Season 4 episode 15 - "Is it True There Are Poxies At The Bottom Of Landfair Lake?" (January 1964) 
 The Twilight Zone: "Number 12 Looks Just Like You": 	Season 5, Episode 17 (1964) 
 The Alfred Hitchcock Hour: "Coyote Moon" (episode aired originally on October 18, 1959): "The Monkey's Paw: A Retelling" (episode aired originally on April 19, 1965): "The Jar" (episode originally aired February 14, 1964)
 Perry Mason:  Season 8, episode 1 "The Case of the Missing Button" (1964)
 The Fugitive: episodes "The Good Guys and the Bad Guys" (December 14, 1965) and "Approach with Care" (November 15, 1966)
 The F.B.I.: Season 2, Episode 16 - "Passage Into Fear" (Jan 8, 1967)
 The Virginian: Season 6 Episode 12 - "The Barren Ground" (December 6, 1967) 
 Death Valley Days: Season 17 Episode 4 - "The Sage Hen" (October 1, 1968) 
 The Immortal: "The Rainbow Butcher" (October 22, 1970)
 Columbo: Season 4, Episode 26 - "An Exercise in Fatality" (September 15, 1974)
 The Waltons: Season 1, Episode 7 - "The Sinner" (October 26, 1972)
 The Streets of San Francisco: Season 2, Episode 2 - "Betrayed" (September 20, 1973)
 Little House On The Prairie: Season 4, Episode 7 - "To Run and Hide" (October 31, 1977)

References

External links

 
 
 

1935 births
2009 deaths
Actresses from North Carolina
American film actresses
American stage actresses
American television actresses
Activists for African-American civil rights
Deaths from brain cancer in the United States
Westtown School alumni
20th-century American actresses
21st-century American actresses